Henderson Waves is a pedestrian bridge crossing Henderson Road in the Southern Ridges in Singapore. The bridge is one of two pedestrian bridges part of the walking trail connecting the Southern Ridges with Mount Faber along with Alexandra Arch, and is the highest pedestrian bridge in Singapore. The sun-shading, curved, wooden ribs are illuminated at night.

History

Plans for two new pedestrian bridges in the Southern Ridges were first announced in 2002 as part of the Urban Redevelopment Authority's plan to enhance the unique qualities of selected areas. A competition was launched by the Urban Redevelopment Authority to seek designs for both bridges, with the design by Singaporean architectural firm RSP Architects Planners & Engineers and IJP Architects being selected as the design for the bridge travelling over Henderson Road. The bridge was opened on 10 May 2008 by Prime Minister Lee Hsien Loong. The bridge is 36m above Henderson Road, thus making it the tallest pedestrian bridge in Singapore, and 274m long and 8m wide. In July, the bridge was shortlisted for the inaugural World Architecture Festival Awards under the transport category.

The bridge went under maintenance works in November 2014, while remaining open to the public.

References

Buildings and structures in Singapore
2008 establishments in Singapore
Bridges in Singapore
Bridge light displays